The Treptow Arena (with a silent w) (also Arena Berlin) is an indoor hall, that hosts concerts, parties and special events, such as car presentations. It can hold up to 7,500. It is located in Berlin, Treptow next to the Spree.

Buildings and structures in Berlin
Indoor arenas in Germany
Sports venues in Berlin